Bob Leverenz (6 February 1925 – 16 March 2009) was an international speedway rider who featured in the 1951 Speedway World Championship final alongside the winner and fellow Adelaide rider Jack Young.

Leverenz was born in Findon, South Australia.

Career
Bob Leverenz spent his entire UK career with the Norwich Stars and was a member of the team that won the National League Division Two championships in 1950 and 1951.

His career highlights included:
Winning four South Australian Championships: 1950 at Kilburn Speedway, 1951, 1952 and 1953, at Rowley Park Speedway.
Winning four Adelaide Golden Helmet's in 1950. Three wins came at Kilburn and the final win came at Rowley Park.
Captaining the Australian Test Team against England at Kilburn Speedway in 1951.
Riding for the Norwich Stars in England from 1949 to 1952.
Winning the Harringay Trophy at Harringay Stadium, London in 1951.
Winning the Festival of Britain, Gold Star, at New Cross Stadium, London, on 2 May 1951.
Setting a track record at Norwich of 71.2 seconds, down from the previous record of 74 seconds.

His league averages for Norwich were:
1949: Division 2: 6.97 points
1950: Division 2: 8.25 points
1951: Division 2: 10.07 points
1952: Division 1: 10.00 points

World Final Appearances
 1951 -  London, Wembley Stadium - 8th - 7pts

References

1925 births
2009 deaths
Australian speedway riders
Sportspeople from Adelaide
Norwich Stars riders